Valley Forge High School is located in Parma Heights, Ohio, a suburb of Cleveland. It is one of three high schools in the Parma City School District, which is one of the largest school districts in the state of Ohio, serving the cities of Parma, Parma Heights, and Seven Hills.  The school's colors are navy blue and white; its sports teams are known as the Patriots.  Valley Forge High School athletic teams compete in the Great Lakes Conference.

In the 2005 Marching Season, Valley Forge Patriot Marching Band became the first band in the Parma City School District to earn the right to attend and perform at the OMEA Marching Band State Finals in Columbus, Ohio. The band performed as a Class AA band. The band was later presented with a commendation for this achievement by the Board of Education for Parma and Parma Heights.

On March 1, 2008, Valley Forge High School was the site of a town hall meeting by former President Barack Obama. He spoke to a crowd of 1,300 in the high school's auditorium on topics including the foreclosure crisis and health care.

Notable alumni
 James Dalessandro - writer and filmmaker
 Andrew Gissinger - former San Diego Chargers offensive lineman
 Jim Kovach - former National Football League linebacker of New Orleans Saints and San Francisco 49ers.
 Jamie Meder - former Cleveland Browns defensive lineman
 Barb Mucha - professional golfer and former LPGA Tour member
 Benjamin Orr - co-founder of rock band The Cars
 Stan Parrish - former football head coach for Kansas State, Ball State and Marshall University, offensive coordinator for  University of Michigan
 Muhamed Sacirbey - ex-UN ambassador for Bosnia
 Christopher Smith - actor, director, and improviser best known for his appearances on Whose Line Is It Anyway?

OHSAA State Championships

 Wrestling - 1972

References

External links
 District Website

1961 establishments in Ohio
Educational institutions established in 1961
High schools in Cuyahoga County, Ohio
Public high schools in Ohio